The tornado outbreak of April 6–9, 1998 was a large tornado outbreak that started on April 6 across the Great Plains and ended on April 9 across the Carolinas and Georgia. A total of 62 tornadoes touched down from the Middle Atlantic States to the Midwestern United States and Texas. The outbreak is infamous for producing a deadly F5 that tore through the suburbs of Birmingham, killing 32 people. The Birmingham tornado was one of only two F5 tornadoes that year. The other hit in Lawrence County, Tennessee, on April 16, as part of the same outbreak as the Nashville F3 tornado. This tornado outbreak was responsible for 41 deaths: 7 in Georgia and 34 in Alabama.

Confirmed tornadoes

April 6 event

April 7 event

April 8 event

April 9 event

Birmingham, Alabama

The worst of the destruction occurred across the cities of Oak Grove, Rock Creek, and McDonald Chapel. The second area affected by F5 damage was also devastated by a violent tornado in 1956 that tracked through the same areas hit by this storm. Debris from the tornado was scattered across central Alabama as far north as sections of Blount County, and extensive deforestation occurred along the majority of the path.

The tornado began in rural Tuscaloosa County, only causing F0 damage there. The tornado reached F1 intensity after it entered Jefferson County, and then rapidly intensified to an F3 as it slammed into Oak Grove, an unincorporated town west of Rock Creek. Oak Grove was one of the hardest hit locations, with many structures destroyed in the area. Oak Grove High School sustained major structural damage, and the elementary school portion was destroyed.  The school building was rebuilt two years later and reopened a mile away from the damaged area. No one inside the school was killed, but a group of cheerleaders practicing at the school's gymnasium escaped disaster with only minor injuries when a wall prevented a portion of the roof from falling on them. The tornado caused its first three fatalities in Oak Grove, which occurred when a mobile home completely disintegrated, throwing the occupants across the street; only one survived. The Oak Grove fire station was severely damaged as well.

The tornado continued to intensify dramatically as it moved northeast, reaching F5 intensity as it struck Rock Creek. Many homes in the town were leveled or swept completely away, and the roof of Rock Creek Church of God was blown off. Several cars in the church parking lot were thrown into a 50-foot deep ravine. The church was turned into a makeshift trauma center immediately after the tornado. A total of eleven people were killed in Rock Creek. The far western fringes of Concord were impacted in this area as well (particularly the Warrior River Road area). The tornado weakened slightly to F4 intensity as it struck the neighboring community of Sylvan Springs, where many additional homes were completely leveled, and four people were killed. Homes were damaged and destroyed just outside Pleasant Grove as well.

Continuing past Pleasant Grove, the tornado began to encroach on Birmingham's inner suburbs. This tornado regained its maximum F5 strength as it tore through the communities of Edgewater and McDonald Chapel. Fourteen people lost their lives there and the storm swept away numerous homes. The tornado's effects were noticed around the same time by the ABC 33/40 Birmingham tower camera, which was pointed toward the western suburbs. Even though it was dark, a massive power failure occurred in western Birmingham, when several transmission lines coming from the Miller Steam Plant electric generating station were knocked off line. This was noticed during the long-form weather coverage on ABC 33/40, which lasted most of the evening; the station, and several of its competitors, has a policy of pre-empting regular programming and broadcasting only severe weather information when a tornado warning is in effect for any part of its coverage area. The storm began to weaken somewhat as it crossed Alabama State Route 269 into the northern Birmingham neighborhood of Pratt City, though it was still very powerful. F3 damage and several injuries occurred in Pratt City before the tornado abruptly dissipated. Had the tornado remained on the ground, it would have gone into the northern sections of downtown Birmingham. A few miles further to the east, the Birmingham International Airport could have been affected as well. The storm lifted before reaching these sections of Birmingham. However, a new F2 tornado touched down again in neighboring St. Clair County, where two people were killed.

The tornado was at the time the seventh deadliest in Alabama history, killing one more person than in a tornado that hit Alabama on March 21, 1932; a young boy died nine days after this event from head injuries. His father was paralyzed from the waist down, and his mother suffered severe injuries. Another mother and her two children, despite taking shelter in their underground basement, were killed when hundreds of pounds of debris was blown onto them. Overall, 32 people were killed by the tornado and hundreds more were injured.

Dunwoody, Georgia

After producing three F2+ tornadoes in Alabama, the Birmingham supercell moved into Georgia, producing another F2 in Cobb County. After that tornado lifted, this tornado, also rated F2, touched down at 12:35 a.m. on April 9, just northeast of Perimeter Center in DeKalb County. It damaged thousands of homes and downed tens of thousands of native pine and hardwood forest trees. Hundreds of homes had major damage, a few dozen were destroyed (or nearly so) and were condemned, having to be completely rebuilt. The campus of DeKalb College (now Perimeter College at Georgia State University) sustained heavy damage. One person was killed in DeKalb County.

The storm continued into Gwinnett County, somewhat weakened, but still causing extensive damage in Peachtree Corners. It continued to Duluth, crossing the center of town and lifting briefly, taking shingles off the roofs of houses in downtown Duluth. Many more trees were snapped along Old Peachtree Road near Interstate 85. The current Norcross High School sits on land deforested by the tornado, and then purchased by the Gwinnett school board. In 2007, the county began seeking a grant from GEMA to help it reinstate a system of tornado sirens, beginning with eleven to be installed along the path of the 1998 tornado.

See also
List of tornadoes and tornado outbreaks
List of North American tornadoes and tornado outbreaks
Tornado outbreak of April 1977

References

Notes

External links 

April 8, 1998 Tornado (NWS Birmingham, AL)
NWS Service Assessment
1998 Tornado Project.

F5 tornadoes
Tornadoes of 1998
Tornadoes in Alabama
Tornadoes in Tennessee
Tornadoes in Georgia (U.S. state)
1998 in Alabama
1998 in Georgia (U.S. state)
1998 natural disasters in the United States
April 1998 events